Singapore Business Federation (Abbreviation: SBF; ;) is the apex business chamber in Singapore. SBF aims to improve the organisation of the business community in Singapore and represent it both locally and abroad.

SBF was formed on 1 April 2002 as the successor to the Singapore Federation of Chambers of Commerce and Industry, which had consisted of five business chambers and associations in Singapore. SBF has compulsory membership, unlike its predecessor which had struggled financially as a result of voluntary membership. As of December 2020, SBF has 27,200 members, including both companies and business chambers. SBF carries out events such as talks and dialogue sessions for its members, and provides them with various business networks.

References 

Singapore Business Federation
Chambers of commerce
Business organisations based in Singapore
2002 establishments in Singapore